Alexander Todd may refer to:

 Alexander Todd (rugby union) (1873–1915), England and British Lions rugby union player
 Alexander R. Todd (1907–1997), Scottish biochemist and Nobel Prize winner
 Alexander Tod, English football player in the 1881 FA Cup Final
 Alexander Todd Visiting Professor of Chemistry, a professorship at the University of Cambridge